Sebastian Iwasaki (born 20 February 1991, in Warsaw) is a Polish former competitive figure skater. He is the 2010 Polish bronze medalist and 2009 junior national champion. He competed at two World Junior Championships, qualifying for the final segment at the 2010 competition in The Hague. He finished 18th overall in the Netherlands.

Iwasaki was coached by Adam Zalegowski as a child, Sarkis Tewanian in the 2006–07 season, Zbigniew Turkowski in 2007–09, and Alexey Fedoseev in 2010–11.

Programs

Competitive highlights
JGP: ISU Junior Grand Prix

References

External links 

 

1991 births
Living people
Polish male single skaters
Figure skaters from Warsaw